This is a list of the best-selling singles in 2018 in Japan, physical and digital sales are taken from Oricon yearly chart.

See also
List of Oricon number-one singles of 2018
List of number-one digital singles of 2018 (Japan)

References

2018 in Japanese music
2018
Oricon
Japanese music-related lists